Richard David De Wert (November 17, 1931 – April 5, 1951) was a United States Navy hospital corpsman who was killed in action during the Korean War while serving with a Marine Corps rifle company. He was posthumously awarded the nation's highest military decoration for valor, the Medal of Honor, for heroic actions "above and beyond the call of duty" on April 5, 1951, in South Korea.

Biography
Richard De Wert was born on November 17, 1931 in Taunton, Massachusetts.

De Wert enlisted in the United States Navy in December 1948. Following recruit training and Hospital Corps training at Naval Station Great Lakes, Illinois, he was assigned to the Naval Hospital at Portsmouth, Virginia, during 1949–1950. In July 1950, he joined the Fleet Marine Force and soon sailed for the Far East to take part in the Korean War. Landing with the 1st Marine Division at Inchon in September 1950, Hospitalman De Wert participated in operations to liberate the city of Seoul. During the rest of 1950, he was involved in the landing at Wonsan, the Chosin Reservoir Campaign and the Hungnam evacuation.

In 1951, De Wert served with the Marines in anti-guerilla operations and as they helped drive the enemy beyond the 38th Parallel. On April 5, 1951, while with the 2nd Battalion, 7th Marines during an attack on People's Volunteer Army forces during Operation Rugged, De Wert persistently, and in spite of his own wounds, moved through fire-swept ground to aid fallen Marines. He was killed in action while administering first aid to an injured comrade.

Namesake
The frigate  was named in honor of Hospitalman De Wert.

A clinic in Newport, Rhode Island was named after DeWert on September 17, 2004.

The clinic at the Marine Cold Weather Base in Bridgeport, California was named for DeWert in October 2004.

A scholarship fund at Pepperdine University has been named for DeWert.

Dewert Ave in Taunton, MA is named in his honor.

Military awards
De Wert's military awards and decorations include:

A display of the Medal of Honor and more information about Richard DeWert is on display at the Old Colony Historical Society, in Taunton, Massachusetts.

Medal of Honor citation

See also

List of Medal of Honor recipients
List of Korean War Medal of Honor recipients

References

External links

Who's Who in Marine Corps History

1931 births
1951 deaths
United States Navy Medal of Honor recipients
United States Navy corpsmen
People from Taunton, Massachusetts
American military personnel killed in the Korean War
Korean War recipients of the Medal of Honor
United States Navy personnel of the Korean War
Burials at Massachusetts National Cemetery